Orlando Martínez (September 2, 1944 – September 22, 2021) was a Cuban bantamweight boxer, who won the gold medal at the 1972 Summer Olympics. Three years later he captured the gold at the 1975 Pan American Games. Orlando was awarded a hotly disputed 3–2 split decision over Great Britain's George Turpin in the 1972 Munich Olympics semifinal before coasting to a comfortable points win over future professional world bantamweight champion Alfonso Zamora in the final to win the division's gold medal.

1968 Olympic results
Below are the results of Orlando Martinez of Cuba, a boxer who competed in the flyweight division of the 1968 Mexico City Olympics:

 Round of 32: lost to Tibor Badari (Hungary) by decision, 1–4

1972 Olympic results
Below are the results of Orlando Martinez of Cuba, a boxer who competed in the bantamweight division of the 1972 Munich Olympics:

 Round of 64: bye
 Round of 32: Defeated Win Maung (Burma) by decision, 4–1
 Round of 16: Defeated Michael Dowling (Ireland) by decision, 3–2
 Quarterfinal: Defeated Ferry Moniaga (Indonesia) by decision, 5–0
 Semifinal: Defeated George Turpin (Great Britain) by decision, 3–2
 Final: Defeated Alfonso Zamora (Mexico) by decision, 5–0 (won gold medal)

References

External links
profile 
profile 
Olympic profile

1944 births
2021 deaths
Olympic boxers of Cuba
Olympic gold medalists for Cuba
Boxers at the 1968 Summer Olympics
Boxers at the 1972 Summer Olympics
Boxers at the 1976 Summer Olympics
Olympic medalists in boxing
Cuban male boxers
Medalists at the 1972 Summer Olympics
Boxers at the 1975 Pan American Games
Pan American Games gold medalists for Cuba
Pan American Games medalists in boxing
Bantamweight boxers
Medalists at the 1975 Pan American Games
20th-century Cuban people